This is a list of actors who have played Santa Claus in film and on television, including voice acting roles.  This does not count actors whose characters have dressed as Santa Claus.

Santa Claus
Actors